At the end of the 1960s, British Railways adopted the Total Operations Processing System (TOPS), a computerised system developed by the Southern Pacific Railroad in the United States. All types of locomotive and multiple unit received a TOPS classification, but the first attempt at applying TOPS was soon modified. This page explains the first attempt at using TOPS and cross-refers the classes allocated with those adopted in the successful re-arrangement. An explanation of the final arrangements for TOPS classification may be found here.

Locomotives
The first attempt to apply TOPS differed from the latter approach in two significant ways:
 xx/0 was not a valid subclass number. When the second arrangement was applied, original subclasses xx/1 became xx/0, xx/2 became xx/1 and so on.
 Some detail differences within classes were considered sufficient for a different class number to be allocated, rather than indicate it with a subclass. In addition, there are a number of cases where conversions led to complete reclassification, where similar circumstances later would be indicated simply by allocating a new subclass. The change in approach led to some odd gaps in the list of locomotive classes when they were re-arranged, as the principal class numbers were retained unaltered. Classes affected by this change in approach include:
 Class 29 (re-engined Class 21)
 Class 31 (re-engined Class 30)
 Class 34 (became Class 33/1)
 Class 43 (North British Locomotive-built Class 42 with different make of engine and torque-converter)
 Class 48 (Class 47 with experimental Sulzer vee-formation engine; later rebuilt to standard class 47 with in-line twin-bank engine)
 Class 72 (became Class 73/0)

Diesel Multiple Units
The first attempt to apply TOPS to diesel multiple units saw each carriage within a unit being allocated its own unique class number. This was probably because most DMUs were not kept in permanent formations. Classes were allocated according to the following division:
 100-131: Driving Motor cars
 140-150: Driving Trailer cars
 160-190: Trailer cars
 201-203: DEMU Driving Motor cars
 211-212: DEMU Driving Trailer cars
 221-225: DEMU Trailer cars
     251: Express DEMU Driving Motor cars
     261: Express DEMU Trailer cars

However, this arrangement was later revised so that each unit adopted the class number previously given just to the main type of Driving Motor car (the exception being the DEMU units, which were completely changed). The table below cross-references the old and new TOPS classes:

Electric Multiple Units
The first attempt to apply TOPS to the Southern Region's fleet of electric multiple units, saw classes being allocated according to the following division:
 40x: Southern Railway designed units
 41x: 1951-type British Railways designed units
 42x: 1957-type British Railways designed units
 43x: 1963-type British Railways designed units
 44x: 1967-type British Railways designed units
 45x: Underground ('Tube'-sized) units
 46x: 1971-type British Railways designed units

In comparison with the later re-arrangement, it is worth noting that types that were different were given the same class (e.g. the single-car luggage vans) and identified only by subclass, while those that were later treated as variations of the same class, were separated according to their construction period (e.g. early or late 1950s builds). When the new arrangement was applied, 40x classes were left untouched, but the others were changed as follows:

References

British Rail numbering and classification systems